Lomaridium contiguum, synonym Blechnum contiguum, is a fern in the family Blechnaceae. The specific epithet refers to the contiguous lobes of the fronds.

Description
The plant is a climbing epiphytic fern. Its rhizome is long and covered with dense, narrowly lanceolate scales. Its fronds are 30–50 cm or more long and 5–12 cm wide.

Distribution and habitat
The fern is found on Australia's subtropical Lord Howe Island in the Tasman Sea, as well as on New Caledonia. On Lord Howe it is common in the cloud forest on the summits of Mounts Gower and Lidgbird.

References

Blechnaceae
Epiphytes
Flora of Lord Howe Island
Flora of New Caledonia
Plants described in 1861
Ferns of Australia